The lawn bowls competition at the 1930 British Empire Games featured three events for men: a singles, pairs, and a rinks (fours) contest. The event was held at Gage Park.

Medal table

Medal summary

Notes
(*) Tom Chambers was a Canadian. One of the original Scottish team members (Mr John Kennedy) had died suddenly while visiting friends in Buffalo, New York, on the journey to Canada. The other teams agreed that Chambers could be used as a substitute even though he was not Scottish.

Men's singles – round robin

Results

Men's pairs – round robin

Results

Men's rinks (fours) – round robin

Results

References

Commonwealth Games Medallists - Bowls. GBR Athletics. Retrieved on 2010-07-21.

See also
List of Commonwealth Games medallists in lawn bowls
Lawn bowls at the Commonwealth Games

1930 British Empire Games events
1930
1930 in sports
1930 in bowls